Szilágyi Dezső Square Reformed Church is a Protestant church in Budapest. It was built by Samu Pecz from 1894 to 1896.

External links

Churches in Budapest
19th-century Calvinist and Reformed churches
19th-century churches in Hungary